O.D. is one of the founders of the industrial/metal/electronic band Velcra. He has worked on samples/programming and guitars on the band's first two albums and is the main producer on their third album.

External links
Velcra homepage

Year of birth missing (living people)
Living people
21st-century Finnish male singers
Place of birth missing (living people)
Finnish male guitarists